Cavalcade of America is an anthology drama series that was sponsored by the DuPont Company, although it occasionally presented musicals, such as an adaptation of Show Boat, and condensed biographies of popular composers. It was initially broadcast on radio from 1935 to 1953, and on television from 1952 to 1957. Originally on CBS, the series pioneered the use of anthology drama for company audio advertising.

Cavalcade of America documented historical events using stories of individual courage, initiative and achievement, often with feel-good dramatizations of the human spirit's triumph against all odds. The series was intended to improve DuPont's public image after World War I. The company's motto, "Maker of better things for better living through chemistry," was read at the beginning of each program, and the dramas emphasized humanitarian progress, particularly improvements in the lives of women, often through technological innovation.

Background
The show started as part of a successful campaign to reinvigorate DuPont. In the early 1930s, the Nye Committee investigations concluded that DuPont had made a fortune profiteering in World War I. The company stood accused of encouraging an arms race between World War I enemies, after being heavily subsidized by the Allies to increase black powder production. The negative effects of the investigation left the company demoralized, directionless and with a tarnished corporate image in the middle of the Great Depression.

DuPont's products were primarily not for public consumption, so there was no purpose in promoting them through advertising. As a solution to DuPont's troubles, Roy S. Durstine, then creative director of Batten, Barton, Durstine & Osborn, proposed the creation of Cavalcade of America using the company motto. This was to be an important element in the successful re-branding of DuPont as an American legacy engaged in making products for the well-being of Americans and humanity in general.

Content
DuPont's image problems led the company to promote some pacifist and socialist ideals. DuPont stipulated several topics would be taboo on the show, such as gunfire of any kind, which attracted writers such as Norman Rosten and Arthur Miller, who had signed the Oxford Pledge while at University of Michigan. For scripts, the program was also able to attract such prominent writers as Maxwell Anderson, Stephen Vincent Benét, Carl Sandburg and Robert Sherwood. Although Yale University historian Frank Monaghan signed on as an advisor to ensure historically accuracy of the scripts, listeners were quick to point out anachronisms; trains did not use air brakes in 1860 and Washington's troops could not have sung "Tannenbaum" while crossing the Delaware since it was written two months after that event.

Notable cast
This is the cast listing according to The Concise Encyclopedia of American Radio.

Narrator
Walter Huston

Actors:

 Walter Brennan
 Ray Collins
 Ted de Corsia
 Kenny Delmar
 Ross Elliott
 Cary Grant
 Gary Gray
 Ted Jewett
 Raymond Edward Johnson
 Bill Johnstone
 John McIntire
 Agnes Moorehead
 Dennis Morgan
 Jeanette Nolan
 Tyrone Power
 Frank Readick
 Ronald Reagan
 Stafford Repp
 Mickey Rooney
 Luis van Rooten
 Everett Sloane
 Jack Smart
 Paul Stewart
 Karl Swenson
 Orson Welles

Advertising
Cavalcade of America made a major impact in radio advertising during its run on the air. DuPont, a chemical corporation that did not sell public goods, sponsored Cavalcade of America and integrated their company slogan and agenda into the inspirational and pro-American achievement themes of each episode.

After DuPont's war profits were revealed to be in the billions and the company's stock nearly quadrupled, the American public saw DuPont negatively as one of the “merchants of death” after World War I. This forced Cavalcade of America to fall in line with avoiding the use of many radio cliches of the day, including gunfire and depicting blacks on the radio. The writers of Cavalcade of America supported this move by DuPont, as the staff was made up of mainly young academics that were either pacifists or signed an anti-war pledge in college. With new writers and a world-class PR firm, DuPont was able to shake the “merchant of death” label and remained a sponsor for a top radio program.

Cavalcade of America was an early exercise in corporate image-building. DuPont promoted itself as a hero for America. This type of propaganda was shrewd but effective; it put a corporate image behind the real-life heroes that lived a century before. One way DuPont was able to emphasize its own products in episodes of Cavalcade of America was by having health-related episodes that promoted the use of chemical-compound products manufactured by DuPont. This was not necessarily advertising, since individuals could not go to the store and purchase these chemical items.

According to DuPont public relations executives, the goal was not to directly sell their products, but rather to explain the company's goals and foster the confidence, respect and goodwill of the public. By recreating little-known events in the lives of historically-respected Americans through dramatizations, Cavalcade of America caused listeners to associate DuPont's products with patriotism and self-reliance. The series also gave history and chemistry more prestige than it would have otherwise had. By making the show thrilling, but not over-sensationalized, DuPont was able to better its own branding and get away from being perceived as a military-only company.

Nylon show
On May 15, 1940 DuPont made nylon women's hosiery available to the public and began an advertising blitz. The day was designated "N-day" by DuPont's marketeers, and an entire episode of Cavalcade of America was markedly different: DuPont selected a "typical" housewife to interview G.P. Hoff, Director of Research of DuPont's Nylon Division. In the rigged interview, Hoff expounded at length on the virtues of nylon. Eager to purchase nylon hose, thousands of women waited in lines for department stores to open the following morning. 750,000 nylons had been manufactured for N-Day, but all were sold on the first day they went on sale.

Television

In the 1950s, DuPont switched its advertising strategy from radio to television, and Cavalcade of America became a television series mainly produced by Jack Chertok. One hundred and thirty-three episodes were aired over five seasons between 1952 and 1957. During a six-month period, the television and radio series overlapped. The show was telecast on both NBC (1952–53) and ABC (1953–57). It was renamed DuPont Cavalcade Theater in August 1955, and it was known as DuPont Theater during its last year. In the 1957 fall season, it was replaced by The DuPont Show of the Month, a 90-minute live dramatization of popular novels and short stories or abridged versions of films and plays. That series ran until 1961. 

Many kinescopes of Cavalcade of America survive at the UCLA Film and Television Archive.

Season 1 (1952–53)

Season 2 (1953–54)

Season 3 (1954–55)

Season 4 (1955–56)

Season 5 (1956–57)

Books

During the late 1930s, Dixon Ryan Fox and Arthur Meier Schlesinger edited a series of books based on the series published by Milton Bradley. In 1956, the series was adapted into a book, Cavalcade of America: The Deeds and Achievements of the Men and Women Who Made Our Country Great, published by Crown. Chapters covered such historical figures as Abraham Lincoln, telegraph organizer Hiram Sibley, engineer James Eads, John Quincy Adams fighting the gag rule and Clara Barton's career that led her to head the American Red Cross. Martin Grams, Jr.'s The History of the Cavalcade of America (Morris Publishing, 1998) features episode guides for both the radio and TV series.

See also

 Academy Award
 Author's Playhouse
 The Campbell Playhouse
 The CBS Radio Workshop
 Curtain Time
 Ford Theatre
 General Electric Theater
 Lux Radio Theater
 The Mercury Theatre on the Air
 The MGM Theater of the Air
 Screen Director's Playhouse
 The Screen Guild Theater
 Suspense
 The United States Steel Hour

Notes

References
 Blue, Howard (2002). Words at War: World War II Era Radio and the Postwar Broadcasting Industry Blacklist. Lanham, Maryland: Scarecrow Press.

Further reading
 William L. Bird, Jr. "Better Living": Advertising, Media, and the New Vocabulary of Business Leadership, 1935–1955. Evanston, IL: Northwestern University Press, 1999.

External links
 Cavalcade of America – Jerry Haendiges Vintage Radio Logs
 Cavalcade of America at CVTA
 Cavalcade of America clips at the Hagley Library
 
 Cavalcade of America  at Museum of Broadcast Communications
 Company Voice Advertising at Museum of Broadcast Communications
 Cavalcade of America in American Studies at the University of Virginia
 Cavalcade of America scripts Billy Rose Theatre Division, The New York Public Library

Listen to
 
 Cavalcade of America at OTR.Network Library

Watch
 Public domain TV episode A Chain of Hearts on Internet Archive, with original commercials

1952 American television series debuts
1957 American television series endings
1935 radio programme debuts
1953 radio programme endings
1930s American radio programs
1940s American radio programs
1950s American radio programs
1950s American anthology television series
American Broadcasting Company original programming
1950s American drama television series
Black-and-white American television shows
CBS Radio programs
English-language television shows
NBC original programming
Peabody Award-winning radio programs
NBC radio programs

Anthology radio series